Rio de Janeiro is a city in Brazil.

Rio de Janeiro may also refer to:

Rio de Janeiro (state), a state of Brazil
Greater Rio de Janeiro, the metropolitan area of the city in Brazil
A former name for Guanabara Bay
Rio de Janeiro (Bahia), a river in the Brazilian state of Bahia
Río de Janeiro (Buenos Aires Metro), a metro station in Buenos Aires
Protocol of Rio de Janeiro, a 1942 international agreement

See also
Battle of Rio de Janeiro (disambiguation)
Rio de Janeiro (ship)